Pierre Gabriel (1 August 1933 – 24 November 2015), also known as Peter Gabriel, was a French mathematician at the University of Strasbourg (1962–1970), University of Bonn (1970–1974) and University of Zürich (1974–1998) who worked on category theory, algebraic groups, and representation theory of algebras.  He was elected a correspondent member of the French Academy of Sciences in November 1986.

His most famous result is Gabriel's theorem that provides a classification of all quivers of finite type.

References

External links

 
Personal Web Page

1933 births
2015 deaths
20th-century French mathematicians
21st-century French mathematicians
Algebraists
University of Paris alumni
Academic staff of the University of Zurich
Members of the French Academy of Sciences
People from Bitche
French expatriates in Germany
French expatriates in Switzerland